Olearia traversiorum, the Chatham Island akeake, or Chatham Island tree daisy, is a species of flowering plant in the family Asteraceae. It is endemic to the Chatham Islands of New Zealand. It is also known by the synonym O. traversii.

It is grown in other areas with mild oceanic climates such as Scotland.

References

traversiorum
Flora of the Chatham Islands
Near threatened plants
Taxonomy articles created by Polbot
Taxobox binomials not recognized by IUCN